The eastern rock elephant shrew or eastern rock sengi (Elephantulus myurus) is a species of elephant shrew in the family Macroscelididae. It is found in Botswana, Mozambique, South Africa, and Zimbabwe. Its natural habitats are subtropical or tropical dry lowland grassland and rocky areas.

Breeding 
Eastern rock elephant shrews are one of three sengi species known to breed seasonally, during the spring and summer. Environmental factors that influence breeding patterns include temperature, rainfall, and lack of food. Mothers normally give birth to two sets of twins. Their young are known to walk very soon. Although rainfall affects food availability, it does not seem to have direct impact on female E. myurus reproduction. Rainfall and ambient temperature do affect male E. myurus reproduction.

References

Elephant shrews
Mammals described in 1906
Taxa named by Oldfield Thomas
Taxonomy articles created by Polbot